UKN may refer to:

 University of Kang Ning, Tainan, Taiwan
 Ukraine Air Enterprise, an airline (by ICAO airline designator)
 Waukon Municipal Airport, an airport in Iowa (by IATA airport code)
 Mohammed Ali (duo), a Swedish hip hop duo earlier known as UKN
 United Kingdom Navy